The Dresden Performance is the twenty-second album by Klaus Schulze. It was originally released in 1990. This is the first of seven early-1990s Klaus Schulze albums not reissued by Revisited Records. Although this album is labeled as "live", parts 3, 4 and 5 are studio tracks.

Track listing
All the tracks are composed by Klaus Schulze.

Disc 1

Disc 2

References

External links
 The Dresden Performance at the official site of Klaus Schulze
 

Klaus Schulze albums
1990 live albums
Klaus Schulze live albums